Ochrotrichia is a large genus of microcaddisflies. All are Nearctic or Neotropical in distribution apart from Ochrotrichia verbekei, recorded from the Democratic Republic of the Congo.

Species

Ochrotrichia affinis
Ochrotrichia alargada
Ochrotrichia aldama
Ochrotrichia alexanderi
Ochrotrichia alsea
Ochrotrichia anisca
Ochrotrichia anomala
Ochrotrichia amorfa
Ochrotrichia apalachicola
Ochrotrichia argentea
Ochrotrichia arizonica
Ochrotrichia arranca
Ochrotrichia arriba
Ochrotrichia arva
Ochrotrichia assita
Ochrotrichia attenuata
Ochrotrichia avis
Ochrotrichia ayaya
Ochrotrichia bicaudata
Ochrotrichia bipartita
Ochrotrichia blanca
Ochrotrichia boquillas
Ochrotrichia bractea
Ochrotrichia brayi
Ochrotrichia brodzinskyi
Ochrotrichia buccata
Ochrotrichia burdicki
Ochrotrichia cachonera
Ochrotrichia caimita
Ochrotrichia calcarata
Ochrotrichia caligula
Ochrotrichia campanilla
Ochrotrichia capitana
Ochrotrichia caramba
Ochrotrichia catarina
Ochrotrichia cavitectum
Ochrotrichia chaulioda
Ochrotrichia chiapa
Ochrotrichia cieneguilla
Ochrotrichia citra
Ochrotrichia compacta
Ochrotrichia concha
Ochrotrichia confusa
Ochrotrichia contorta
Ochrotrichia contrerasi
Ochrotrichia corneolus
Ochrotrichia crucecita
Ochrotrichia cruces
Ochrotrichia curvata
Ochrotrichia cuspidata
Ochrotrichia dactylophora
Ochrotrichia dardeni
Ochrotrichia delgada
Ochrotrichia denaia
Ochrotrichia denningi
Ochrotrichia doehleri
Ochrotrichia dulce
Ochrotrichia eliaga
Ochrotrichia elongiralla
Ochrotrichia ecuatoriana
Ochrotrichia escoba
Ochrotrichia eyipantla
Ochrotrichia felipe
Ochrotrichia filiforma
Ochrotrichia flagellata
Ochrotrichia flexura
Ochrotrichia flintiana
Ochrotrichia footei
Ochrotrichia glabra
Ochrotrichia graysoni
Ochrotrichia guadalupensis
Ochrotrichia gurneyi
Ochrotrichia hadria
Ochrotrichia hamatilis
Ochrotrichia hondurenia
Ochrotrichia honeyi
Ochrotrichia ildria
Ochrotrichia indefinida
Ochrotrichia ingloria
Ochrotrichia insularis
Ochrotrichia intermedia
Ochrotrichia intortilis
Ochrotrichia involuta
Ochrotrichia islenia
Ochrotrichia ixcateopana
Ochrotrichia ixtlahuaca
Ochrotrichia limonensis
Ochrotrichia lobifera
Ochrotrichia logana
Ochrotrichia lometa
Ochrotrichia longispina
Ochrotrichia lucia
Ochrotrichia lupita
Ochrotrichia machiguenga
Ochrotrichia manuensis
Ochrotrichia marica
Ochrotrichia maya
Ochrotrichia maycoba
Ochrotrichia membrana
Ochrotrichia mono
Ochrotrichia moselyi
Ochrotrichia nacora
Ochrotrichia oblongata
Ochrotrichia obtecta
Ochrotrichia okaloosa
Ochrotrichia okanoganensis
Ochrotrichia oregona
Ochrotrichia pacifica
Ochrotrichia palitla
Ochrotrichia palmata
Ochrotrichia panamensis
Ochrotrichia pectinata
Ochrotrichia pectinifera
Ochrotrichia phenosa
Ochrotrichia poblana
Ochrotrichia ponta
Ochrotrichia potomus
Ochrotrichia provosti
Ochrotrichia puyana
Ochrotrichia quadrispina
Ochrotrichia quebrada
Ochrotrichia quinealensis
Ochrotrichia raposa
Ochrotrichia ramona
Ochrotrichia regina
Ochrotrichia regiomontana
Ochrotrichia riesi
Ochrotrichia robisoni
Ochrotrichia rothi
Ochrotrichia salaris
Ochrotrichia serra
Ochrotrichia serrana
Ochrotrichia shawnee
Ochrotrichia silva
Ochrotrichia spina
Ochrotrichia spinosa
Ochrotrichia spinosissima
Ochrotrichia spinula
Ochrotrichia spinulata
Ochrotrichia stylata
Ochrotrichia susanae
Ochrotrichia tagala
Ochrotrichia tarsalis
Ochrotrichia tenanga
Ochrotrichia tenuata
Ochrotrichia transylvanica
Ochrotrichia trapoiza
Ochrotrichia trinitatis
Ochrotrichia tuscaloosa
Ochrotrichia unica
Ochrotrichia unicornia
Ochrotrichia unio
Ochrotrichia velascoi
Ochrotrichia verbekei
Ochrotrichia verda
Ochrotrichia vertreesi
Ochrotrichia vieja
Ochrotrichia villarenia
Ochrotrichia weddleae
Ochrotrichia weoka
Ochrotrichia wojcickyi
Ochrotrichia xena
Ochrotrichia yanayacuana
Ochrotrichia yavesia
Ochrotrichia yepachica
Ochrotrichia zihuaquia
Ochrotrichia zioni

References
Trichoptera World Checklist

Hydroptilidae
Trichoptera genera